Daniel Gallery (April 13, 1859 – November 9, 1920) was a Canadian politician.

Born near  Labasheeda, in Slievedooley, County Clare, Ireland, the son of Thomas Gallery and Mary O'Neill. Daniel Gallery moved with his fathers and brothers to Montreal Quebec in the early 1860s, after his father Thomas was evicted from his farms at Slievedooley.  Daniel's brother John set up a successful large bakery in Montreal Gallery Brothers.

Daniel Gallery was educated at the Christian Brothers' School. A merchant, he was an Alderman from 1898 to 1903 and acting mayor. 
For four years Daniel was School Commissioner of the Catholic Schools Board in Montreal. He visited Ireland in 1907 as part of a delegation from the Montreal Educational Commission,  visited the Presentation brothers in Cork and was instrumental in bringing the Brothers to Canada in 1910 to improve education for English speaking Catholics. He was a lifetime member of the Young Irishman's Literary and Benefit Association.

He was first elected to the House of Commons of Canada at the general elections of 1900. He served as Liberal Party Whip from 1902 on.  He was re-elected at the general elections of 1904. A Liberal, he served until 1906 when the election was declared void. He was defeated in the 1917 federal election when he ran as an independent.

Once World War 1 broke out Daniel was instrumental in setting up a Home Guard in Montreal.

He was a member of several benevolent societies including the Catholic Order of Foresters and the Knights of Columbanus. He was Vice President of the Ancient Order of Hibernians. In 1894 Daniel was Grand Marshal of the Montreal St Patrick's day parade.

Daniel was extremely proud of his Irish heritage and descent and was a big promoter of Home Rule for Ireland. His obituary mentions his paternal descent from some prominent Clare families Sheehy, McMahon and Lysaght and his maternal descent from the O'Neills originally Earls of Dungannon and that his maternal Grandfather John O'Neill was a prominent supporter of O'Connell.

Daniel  was married to Mathilda O'Neill, they had seven daughters and one son.

"Gallery Square"  was named after Daniel Gallery in 1930 and still exists in Griffintown in Montreal.

References
 
 The Canadian Parliament; biographical sketches and photo-engravures of the senators and members of the House of Commons of Canada. Being the tenth Parliament, elected November 3, 1904
 Family records of descendants of Daniel Gallery
 The Presentation Brothers a centenary in Canada 1910 to 2010 
 handwritten records in the Presentation brothers Archives, Cork, Ireland
 Canadian National Archives Audet, [n.d.], pp. 681–682.(translated from the French)
 Obituary of Daniel Gallery (translated from the French)
 June 21, 1915 Clare Journal Article “A Loyal Clareman in Canada”
 A Call to Arms, Montreal's honour, European war 1914
 Montreal Daily Star, 27 June 1898, page 10 "The ’98 Centenary, Montreal, 1898"
 Montreal Daily Star, 30 November 1898, page 10 Irish famine black rock, Montreal, 1898
 Binghamton Press New York July 21, 1910, "AOH Elects"

1859 births
1920 deaths
Irish emigrants to Canada (before 1923)
Liberal Party of Canada MPs
Members of the House of Commons of Canada from Quebec
Politicians from County Clare
Montreal city councillors